Antaeotricha notogramma is a species of moth in the family Depressariidae. It was described by Edward Meyrick in 1930. It is found in Brazil (Amazon).

The wingspan is about 24 mm. The forewings are violet-whitish-grey and the costal edge is fuscous from the base to four-fifths, the extreme edge grey-whitish. There is some slight brownish suffusion towards the costa on the basal two-fifths, terminated by an indistinct direct transverse fuscous shade from the costa to the fold, then obliquely and faintly extended to a cloudy fuscous spot on the posterior extremity of a slender blackish-fuscous dorsal streak from the subbasal tuft to beyond the middle and there is a small fuscous spot on the costa at one-fourth. There is an irregular fuscous shade from before the middle of the costa to the dorsum at four-fifths, nearly obsolete on the median third but with a small blackish dot indicating the second discal stigma, its dorsal extremity dark fuscous. An elongate mark of fuscous suffusion is found on the costa at three-fourths, where a faint grey-whitish curved line, indistinctly edged pale grey anteriorly, runs to the tornus, rather indented near the costa. A dark fuscous dot is found on the costa near the apex. The hindwings are grey.

References

Moths described in 1930
notogramma
Moths of South America